Maundy Thursday or Holy Thursday (also known as Great and Holy Thursday, Holy and Great Thursday, Covenant Thursday, Sheer Thursday, and Thursday of Mysteries, among other names) is the day during Holy Week that commemorates the Washing of the Feet (Maundy) and Last Supper of Jesus Christ with the Apostles, as described in the canonical gospels.

It is the fifth day of Holy Week, preceded by Holy Wednesday and followed by Good Friday. "Maundy" comes from the Latin word mandatum, or commandment, reflecting Jesus' words "I give you a new commandment."  
The day comes always between March 19 and April 22, inclusive, and will vary according to whether the Gregorian calendar or the Julian calendar is used. Eastern churches generally use the Julian system.

Maundy Thursday initiates the Paschal Triduum, the period which commemorates the passion, death, and resurrection of Jesus. This period includes Good Friday and Holy Saturday, and ends on the evening of Easter Sunday. The Mass of the Lord's Supper or service of worship is normally celebrated in the evening, when Friday begins according to Jewish tradition, as the Last Supper was held on the feast of Passover, according to the three Synoptic Gospels.

Names 

Use of the names "Maundy Thursday", "Holy Thursday", and others is not evenly distributed. The generally accepted name for the day varies according to geographical area and religious affiliation. Thus, although in England "Maundy Thursday" is the normal term, the term "Holy Thursday" is more commonly used in Ireland, Scotland, Canada and the United States, and is the official name used by the Catholic Church in English.

The Book of Common Prayer of the Church of England, which is the mother Church of the Anglican Communion, uses the name "Maundy Thursday" for this observance. The corresponding publication of the US Episcopal Church, which is another province of the Anglican Communion, also refers to the Thursday before Easter as "Maundy Thursday". Throughout the Anglican Communion, the term "Holy Thursday" is a synonym for Ascension Day.

The Roman Rite of the Catholic Church uses the name "Holy Thursday" in its modern English-language liturgical books. The Latin books use the name Feria quinta in Cena Domini ("Thursday of the Supper of the Lord"; the medieval spelling Cœna was used in place of Cena in documents predating the 1955 decree Maxima redemptionis), along with Maundy Thursday as the English name, as given in The Saint Andrew Daily Missal. The personal ordinariates in the Catholic Church, which have an Anglican patrimony, retain the traditional English term "Maundy Thursday", however. An article in the 1911 Catholic Encyclopedia used the term "Maundy Thursday", and some Catholic writers use the same term either primarily, or alternatively.

The Methodist Book of Worship for Church and Home (1965) uses the term "Maundy Thursday"; the Book of Worship (1992) uses the term "Holy Thursday", and other official sources of the United Methodist Church use both "Maundy Thursday" and "Holy Thursday".

Both names are used by other Christian denominations as well, including the Lutheran Church, and certain Reformed Churches. Certain Presbyterian Churches use the term "Maundy Thursday" to refer to the holy day in their official sources.

In the Eastern Orthodox Church, the name for the holy day is, in the Byzantine Rite, "Great and Holy Thursday" or "Holy Thursday", and in Western Rite Orthodoxy "Maundy Thursday", "Holy Thursday" or both. The Coptic Orthodox Church uses the term "Covenant Thursday" or "Thursday of the Covenant".

In the Maronite Church and the Syriac Orthodox Church, the name is "Thursday of Mysteries".

"Maundy Thursday" is the official name of the day in the civil legislation of England and the Philippines.

The day has also been known in English as Shere Thursday (also spelled Sheer Thursday), from the word shere (meaning "clean" or "bright"). This name might refer to the act of cleaning, or to the fact that churches would switch liturgical colors from the dark tones of Lent, or because it was customary to shear the beard on that day, or for a combination of reasons. This name has cognates in the Nordic languages, such as Danish skærtorsdag, Swedish skärtorsdag, Norwegian skjærtorsdag, Faroese skírhósdagur and skírisdagur, Icelandic skírdagur, and Finnish kiirastorstai.

Derivation of the name "Maundy" 

 
Maundy is the name of the Christian rite of footwashing, which traditionally occurs during Maundy Thursday church services.

The English word maundy in the name for the day is derived through Middle English and Old French mandé, from the Latin mandatum (also the origin of the English word "mandate"), the first word of the phrase "Mandatum novum do vobis ut diligatis invicem sicut dilexi vos" ("A new commandment I give unto you: That you love one another, as I have loved you, that you also love one another.") This statement by Jesus in chapter 13 of the Gospel of John by which Jesus explained to the Apostles the significance of his action of washing their feet. 

The phrase is used as the antiphon sung in the Roman Rite during the Maundy (Ecclesiastical Latin: "Mandatum") ceremony of the washing of the feet, which may be held during Mass or as a separate event. A priest or bishop, representing Christ, ceremonially washes the feet of others, typically 12 persons chosen as a cross-section of the community. In 2016, it was announced that the Roman Missal had been revised to allow women to participate as part of the 12 in the Mandatum. Previously, only males partook of the rite.

Others theorize that the English name "Maundy Thursday" arose from "maundsor baskets" or "maundy purses" of alms which the king of England distributed to certain poor at Whitehall before attending Mass on that day.  Thus, "maund" is connected to the Latin mendicare, and French mendier, to beg. 

A source from the Shepherd of the Springs, Lutheran Church likewise states that, if the name was derived from the Latin mandatum, we would call the day Mandy Thursday, or Mandate Thursday, or even Mandatum Thursday. The term "Maundy" comes from the Latin mendicare, Old French mendier, and English maund, which as a verb means to beg and as a noun refers to a small basket held out by maunders as they maunded. Other sources reject this etymology.

Services

Western Christianity

Services

Maundy Thursday celebrations in the United Kingdom, also called Royal Maundy, today involves the Monarch offering "alms" to deserving senior citizens – one man and one woman for each year of the sovereign's age. These coins, known as Maundy money or Royal Maundy, are distributed in red and white purses, and is a custom dating back to King Edward I. The red purse contains regular currency and is given in place of food and clothing. The white purse has money in the amount of one penny for each year of the Sovereign's age. 

Since 1822, rather than ordinary money, the Sovereign gives out Maundy coins, which are specially minted 1, 2, 3 and 4 penny pieces, and are legal tender. The service at which this takes place rotates around English and Welsh churches, though in 2008 it took place for the first time in Northern Ireland at Armagh Cathedral. Until the death of King James II, the Monarch would also wash the feet of the selected poor people. There is an old sketch, done from life, of Queen Elizabeth I washing people's feet on Maundy Thursday.

With Maundy Thursday commemorating the Last Supper, Christian denominations who observe this day universally celebrate the sacrament of Holy Communion, which they teach was instituted by Jesus on this night.

The Maundy (washing of the feet) is practised among many Christian groups on Maundy Thursday, including the Anglican/Protestant Episcopal, Armenian, Ethiopian, Lutheran,  Methodist, Eastern Catholic, Schwarzenau (German Baptist) Brethren, Church of the Brethren, Mennonite,  Presbyterian and Roman Catholic traditions.

In the Catholic Church and in some Anglican churches, the Mass of the Lord's Supper begins as usual, but the Gloria is accompanied by the ringing of church bells, which are then silent until the Easter Vigil. After the homily the washing of feet may be performed. The Blessed Sacrament remains exposed, at least in the Catholic Mass, until the service concludes with a procession taking it to the place of reposition. The altar is later stripped bare, as are all other altars in the church except the Altar of Repose. In other Christian denominations, such as the Lutheran Church or Methodist Church, the stripping of the altar and other items on the chancel also occurs, as a preparation for the somber Good Friday service.

Chrism Mass

The Chrism Mass is a religious service held in Roman Catholicism, Lutheranism and Anglicanism.

Maundy Thursday is notable for being the day on which the Chrism Mass is celebrated in each diocese. Usually held in the diocesan cathedral, it is generally held on the morning of Maundy Thursday, but may in some dioceses take place on another day during Holy Week. It is often the largest annual gathering of clergy and faithful held in most dioceses. The Mass is a celebration of the institution of the priesthood. 

During the Mass, those present are called to renew their baptismal promises. Priests/ministers and deacons also reaffirm their ministry by renewing the promises made at their ordination. The Mass takes its name from the blessing of the holy oils used in the sacraments throughout the year, which are then given to priests to take back to their parishes. 

The service is a 1967 restoration of the rite recorded in the early 200s by the historian Hippolytus who writes of a ceremony taking place during the Easter Vigil at which two holy oils were blessed and one was consecrated. In the fifth century, the ceremony of the oils was transferred from the Holy Saturday Vigil to Holy Thursday during a special Mass for that purpose, distinct from the Mass of the Lord's Supper. In the decree renewing this rite Pope Paul VI said, "The Chrism Mass is one of the principal expressions of the fullness of the bishop’s priesthood and signifies the closeness of the priests with him."

The Holy Oils are:
 Chrism – used in the sacraments of Baptism, Confirmation and Holy Orders, as well as for the consecration of altars and the dedication of churches.
 the oil of catechumens – also used in the sacrament of Baptism, and
 the oil of the sick – used in the rite of the Anointing of the Sick

The oil of the catechumens and chrism are used on the upcoming Holy Saturday at the Easter Vigil, for the baptism and confirmation of those entering the church. While the Oil of the Catechumens and the Oil of the Sick, are simply "blessed," the Sacred Chrism is "consecrated,". Holy chrism is a mixture of olive oil and balsam, an aromatic resin. Balsam is poured into the oil, which gives it a sweet smell intended to remind those who encounter it of the "odor of sanctity" to which those who are marked with it, are called to strive. The bishop breathes over the vessel containing the chrism, a gesture which symbolizes the Holy Spirit coming down to consecrate this oil, and recalls the actions of Jesus in John 20:22, when he breathed on the apostles and said, "Receive the Holy Spirit..."

With respect to Anglicanism, the 1979 Book of Common Prayer (p. 307) calls for chrism to be consecrated by the bishop. In many dioceses, the consecration of chrism by the bishop may be done at a service of reaffirmation of ordination vows during Holy Week. During the Chrism Eucharist, the Bishop will bless the oils used throughout the next year for baptisms and healing. In addition, the Bishop and clergy in attendance will reaffirm their Ordination Vows.

Eastern Christianity

Eastern Orthodoxy

In the Eastern Orthodox Church, the liturgical colours are brighter, white being common. On this day alone during Holy Week, the fast is relaxed to permit consumption of wine and oil.

The primary service of this day is Vespers combined with the Liturgy of St. Basil the Great at which is read a Composite Gospel, primarily taken from Matthew, but with episodes inserted from John (the Washing of the Feet) and Luke (Jesus sweating blood), and many of the normal hymns of the Divine Liturgy are substituted with the following troparion:

Of Thy Mystical Supper, O Son of God, accept me today as a communicant; for I will not speak of Thy Mystery to Thine enemies, neither will I give Thee a kiss like Judas. But like the Thief will I confess Thee: Remember me, O Lord, in Thy Kingdom.

When necessary to replenish the sacrament for communing the sick at a time not following a divine liturgy, an additional Lamb (Host) is consecrated on this day, intincted, covered, and left to dry until Holy Saturday when it is divided, completely dried with a candle flame, and the pieces placed in the artophorion.

In cathedrals and monasteries the ceremony of the Washing of Feet is normally performed. When there is need to consecrate more chrism, that is performed by patriarchs and other heads of the various autocephalous churches.

In the evening, after the Liturgy, all of the hangings and vestments are changed to black or some other dark colour, to signify the beginning of the Passion. Anticipating the Matins of Friday morning, the Holy Passion service of the reading of the Twelve Gospels is conducted. In these readings Christ's last instructions to his disciples are presented, as well as the prophecy of the drama of the Cross, Christ's prayer, and his new commandment. The twelve readings are:

Beginning on Holy and Great Thursday, the memorial service for the dead is forbidden until after Thomas Sunday.

Local customs
 In Greek practice, the Mystery of Unction is performed on Great Wednesday as preparation for the reception of Holy Communion on Great Thursday and Pascha, a custom that originated when Greece was under Ottoman control and parish priests, being uneducated, were not permitted to hear confession, so this sacrament, by which sins are believed to be forgiven, came to be performed.
 In Greek tradition, a procession is made during the service of the Twelve Passion Gospels. It takes place after the reading of the fifth gospel during the singing of "Today He Who Hung". During this procession, a large cross with the body of Christ is carried throughout the church while lights are extinguished, bells are slowly tolled, and the faithful prostrate themselves. The cross, with Christ's body hung upon it, is placed in front of the Royal Doors. The icon of Christ on the cross (sometimes with nails affixing it) is struck upon the hands and feet with a stone multiple times, and is then stood up in front of the church, where it is censed.
 In some Slavic traditions, a lesser procession is made after the Twelve Passion Gospels immediately prior to the dismissal with an icon of Christ's crucifixion which is placed on the central icon stand, where it is censed by the clergy, and then venerated.

Oriental Orthodoxy
Oriental Orthodoxy including Coptic (Egyptian) and Ethiopian Orthodoxy which is under papacy of Pope Tawadros II The Copts celebrate Covenant Thursday on 16 April which is 1 week after the Catholics celebrate it. They have praises and vespers every day of week and on Thursday and Saturday they stay praising God and reading about the First Liturgy and Judas’ Betrayal. On Saturday they sing praises for the Entrance of the Messiah in Hades freeing all of the faithful ones including Moses and Abraham etc.

Customs and names around the world

 If statues and crucifixes have been covered during Passiontide (the last 2 weeks of Lent, at least in the 1962 Catholic missal), the crucifix covers are allowed to be white instead of purple for Holy Thursday.
 The popular German name Gründonnerstag means either "mourning Thursday" or "green Thursday".
 In the Czech Republic and Slovakia the day is called Zelený čtvrtek or Zelený štvrtok respectively, again meaning "Green Thursday", because the typical meals of this day were made of fresh, green vegetables etc. From that day there is no usage of the church bells until Holy Saturday, here called "White Saturday", because "they have flown to Rome" (a euphemism), in some regions they are replaced by groups of children walking round their village (or around the church) and making noise with wooden rattles. This is to announce to the people approaching beginning of the liturgy and to call the people to church.
 The tradition of silent bells also occurs in Luxembourg: the bells fall silent until Easter, because "they have flown to Rome for Confession", so children take to the streets, calling people to church with melancholy wooden rattling.
 In the Netherlands and Belgium, the day is called Witte Donderdag (White Thursday) referring to the liturgical colour of the day.
 In Malta, Holy Thursday is known as Ħamis ix-Xirka (Communion Thursday) and the tradition of visiting seven churches (see below) is called is-seba' visti or is-Sepulkri.
 Eastern Slavic cultures traditionally carried out a range of cleansing ceremonies on Maundy Thursday (sometimes known in Russian as "Clean Thursday").
 In Welsh, Maundy Thursday is Dydd Iau Cablyd.
 In Sweden Maundy Thursday (skärtorsdagen) is connected to old folklore as the day of the witches. Young children often dress up as witches and knock on doors getting coins or candy for Easter eggs.
 In Bulgaria Maundy Thursday is called Veliki Chetvurtuk (Great Thursday), and is traditionally the day when people color their Easter eggs and perform other household chores geared toward preparing for Razpeti Petuk (Crucifixion Friday), Velika Subota (Great Saturday) and Velikden (Easter Day).
 In Kerala the day is called as Pesaha (പെസഹ), a Malayalam word derived from the Aramaic or Syriac word "Peshai" meaning Passover . Maundy Thursday and following Good Friday are observed as statewide public holiday declared by the Government of Kerala, given the high number of Syrian Christians in the state. The tradition of consuming Pesaha appam or Indariyappam is customary after special longer Holy Qurbana, which are conducted on the or at midnight till morning in churches of Saint Thomas Christians. On the evening before Good Friday the Pesaha bread is made at home. It is made with unleavened flour and they use a sweet drink call Pesaha Paal made up of coconut milk and jaggery along with this bread. On the Pesaha night the bread is steamed in a new vessel, immediately after rice flour is mixed with water and they pierce it many times with handle of the spoon to let out the steam so that the bread will not rise. This bread is cut by the head of the family and shared among the family members after prayers. In some families, Pesaha Paal a creamy dip made up of jaggery and coconut milk is used along with the Pesaha bread. If the family is in mourning following a death, Pesaha bread is not made at their home, but some of the Saint Thomas Christian neighbours share their bread with them. The Saint Thomas Christians diaspora also celebrate this day by having Holy Communion services in the parishes according to their respective liturgies. The tradition of washing feet by priests is practiced in every parish commemorating Jesus washing the feet of his disciples symbolizing humbleness.
 In the Philippines, the day is officially known as Huwebes Santo (phonetic transliteration of Jueves Santo in Spanish, Holy Thursday)  or "Maundy Thursday". Most businesses are closed during the Easter Triduum, with shopping malls opening on Black Saturday. Terrestrial television and radio stations either go completely off-air during the Triduum or operate on shorter hours with special programming; cable channels usually retain their normal programming. Newspapers do not publish on Good Friday and Black Saturday.

Public holiday

Maundy Thursday is a public holiday in most countries that were part of the Spanish empire (Argentina, Colombia, Costa Rica, El Salvador, Guatemala, Honduras, Mexico, Nicaragua, Paraguay, Peru, the Philippines, Spain, Uruguay and Venezuela), countries that were part of the Danish colonial empire (Denmark, Iceland, Norway and United States Virgin Islands), and in the Kerala State of India.
Certain German states declare a public holiday for public sector employees. In the UK, civil servants were traditionally granted a half-day holiday (known as "privilege leave") on this date, but that was abolished, by David Cameron, after 2012.

Seven Churches Visitation

The tradition of visiting seven churches on Holy Thursday is an ancient practice, probably originating in Rome. and occurs among the faithful in countries around the world.

In India, the custom is to visit fourteen churches, one per Station of the Cross. Traditionally, this is performed on Maundy Thursday evening but is more often done on the morning of Good Friday or on any day of Lent. Usually, whole families would participate, customarily fasting for the duration of the rite. It is also undertaken by parish devotional groups.

In the Philippines the tradition is called Visita Iglesia (Spanish, "church visit") – people visit churches to pray, usually reciting the Stations of the Cross. It is a chiefly urban custom, as churches are located closer to each other in cities, and supposedly because it originates in visiting the seven churches of Intramuros that stood until the 1945 Bombing of Manila.
The original purpose of the ritual was to venerate the Blessed Sacrament in the Altar of Repose on Maundy Thursday night, but since no prayers were prescribed (apart from those for the Pope), the Stations of the Cross were recited. 

In Singapore, the visiting of churches occurs shortly after the evening Mass of the Lord's Supper. Prayers at each church consist of seven repetitions of the Lord's Prayer, Ave Maria, and the Gloria Patri. Due to the new trend of late Mass times (sometimes 7 or 8 pm) to allow for more churchgoers, eight churches are the maximum number visited (even in the city area, where these are closer to each other than in outer residential areas) before these close at midnight. A festive atmosphere exists, with the sale of drinks, hot cross buns and other local snacks like the traditional kueh ko chee. Observant Catholics have a 'Last Supper' meal in anticipation of the next day's fast.

Gallery

See also

 Corpus Christi
 Easter Triduum
 Friday of Sorrows (Friday before Palm Sunday)
 Life of Jesus in the New Testament
 Maundy
 Paschal cycle
 Tenebrae (service)
 Thursday of the Dead
 Tristis est anima mea (responsory), second responsory for the Tenebrae at Maundy Thursday

References

Bibliography

External links 

 Pope Francis, "Homily for Chrism Mass", News.va, March 28, 2013.
 Cosentino, Tony. "Chrism Mass: its Symbols and Their Meaning", Diocese of St. Catherine's, Ontario.

Thursday observances
Eastern Orthodox liturgical days
Holy Week
March observances
April observances
Public holidays in Greece
Greek traditions
Public holidays in Argentina
Public holidays in Colombia
Public holidays in Costa Rica
Public holidays in El Salvador
Public holidays in Guatemala
Public holidays in Honduras
Public holidays in Mexico
Public holidays in Nicaragua
Public holidays in Paraguay
Public holidays in Peru
Public holidays in the Philippines
Public holidays in Spain
Public holidays in Venezuela
Public holidays in Iceland
Public holidays in Denmark
Public holidays in Norway